Octagon (fully titled Octagon – A Minimal Arcade Game with Maximum Challenge) is a minimalist twitch-reflex video game by Lukas Korba.

Gameplay 
Octagon tasks the player with controlling an octagon in an octagonal world without falling off. There are an infinite number of levels player can play in with the goal of completing the level without falling off. These levels increase in complexity as the player completes levels. The game has 3 controls which the player must use to complete a level which are tapping or swiping left or right to move left or right and swiping upwards to clear vertical gaps.

There is also an endless mode where the player is tasked with the task of controlling the octagon for as long as possible before falling off.

Reception 
Octagon received mixed reviews. Apple'N'Apps gave the game 3.0 out of 5, praising the game's "great design work," "extreme challenge from the outset," and "intuitive controls," while criticizing the lack of variety, the fact that the "controls can cause mix-ups," and the "intrinsic repetition to complete levels."

Sequel 
A sequel was released on May 6, 2020.

See also 
 Duet (video game)
 Super Hexagon
 Impossible Road

References

External links 
 http://www.octagongame.com - Official website

IOS games
MacOS games
Android (operating system) games
Windows Phone games